Highway 131 (AR 131, Ark. 131, and Hwy. 131) is a designation for five north–south state highways in northeast Arkansas. One route of  runs from Highway 1 in Haynes east to Lee County Road 719. A second route of  begins at US Route 79 (US 79) near Brickeys and runs south to the Mississippi River levee. A third route of  forms a semicircle around Horseshoe Lake and Porter Lake, connecting to Highway 147 at both ends. A fourth route of  begins at Highway 147 and runs through Edmondson. A fifth route begins at Interstate 55/US 61/US 64/US 79 (I-55/US 61/US 64/US 79) in West Memphis and runs north to Martin Luther King Jr. Drive/Mound City Road in West Memphis. All routes are maintained by the Arkansas State Highway and Transportation Department (AHTD).

Route description

Haynes to Lee County Wildlife Management Area
Highway 131 begins in Haynes at Highway 1/Crowley's Ridge Parkway and runs east to Lee County Wildlife Management Area. The highway continues slightly further east to terminate at Lee County Road 719 at the St. Francis County line. A segment of this route was discovered to be part of the state highway system in 2011.

Brickeys to Mississippi River
The second segment of Highway 131 begins at US 79 near the unincorporated community of Brickeys. Highway 131 winds south around Raggio and Park Place before terminating at the Mississippi River levee.

Bruins to Thompson Grove

Highway 131 begins at Highway 147 at Bruins near Porter Lake and runs clockwise through the town of Horseshoe Lake. The road continues around the Horseshoe Lake to terminate at Highway 147 at Thompson Grove.

Edmondson route
A fourth segment of Highway 131 begins at Proctor Road at the southern city limits of Edmondson. The highway runs north through downtown Edmondson before turning east and terminating at Highway 147.

West Memphis route
Highway 131 begins at Interstate 55/US 61/US 64/US 79 in West Memphis at exit 3A. The route runs north at a junction with incomplete access to I-40 exit 281. Highway 131 continues north to a fork in the road, continuing north at Mound City Road and south as Martin Luther King Jr. Drive.

Major intersections

See also

 List of state highways in Arkansas

Notes

References

External links

131
Transportation in Lee County, Arkansas
Transportation in Crittenden County, Arkansas